Whitehead is a rural municipality in the province of Manitoba in Western Canada. It is west of Brandon, Manitoba and the principle communities within its boundaries  Kemnay and Alexander.

It became a municipality on 22 December 1883 and was named for Joseph Whitehead, a railway contractor who was active in the area during the 1880s.

Communities
 Alexander
 Ashbury
 Beresford
 Kemnay
 Villette
 Roseland

Demographics 

References 

 Manitoba Historical Society: Rural Municipality of Whitehead
 Geographic Names of Manitoba (pg. 294) - the Millennium Bureau of Canada
 Map of Whitehead R.M. at Statcan

Whitehead